Sex, Drugs, Rock & Roll is a 1991 American film directed by John McNaughton of  Eric Bogosian's one-man stage show of the same name.

References

External links

1990s English-language films
Concert films
1991 films
Films directed by John McNaughton
1991 comedy-drama films
American comedy-drama films
1990s American films